A tracksuit is an article of clothing consisting of two parts: trousers and a jacket usually with front zipper. It was originally intended for use in sports, mainly for athletes to wear over competition clothing (such as running shirt and shorts or a swimsuit) and to take off before competition. In modern times, it has become commonly worn in other contexts. The tracksuit was one of the earliest uses of synthetic fibers in sportswear.

A descendant of the tracksuit, the shell suit, which arrived in the late 1980s, was popular with the hip hop and breakdancing scene of the era.
They were manufactured from a mix of cellulose triacetate and polyester making them shiny on the outside, with distinctive combinations of colours.

Most tracksuits have a mesh interior which allows the user to wear them without any undergarment such as underwear. This is much like a bathing suit. Many people wear it for physical exercise sessions. A sauna suit is a specialized form of tracksuit made of a waterproof fabric such as coated nylon or PVC that is designed to make the wearer sweat profusely.  Sauna suits are primarily used for temporary weight loss.

Other names

The tracksuit is also known as a warm-up suit, or "warmups" for short, as they are intended for athletes to keep their bodies warm before or after competition, and during breaks (especially important in cold weather). In almost all cases, sports teams will wear these garments using a fabric that matches their official team, school, or country colors. The bottoms of tracksuits are also known as sweatpants.

Fashion history
The invention of the tracksuit is understood to have happened in 1930s, however its big break came in the late 1960s when Adidas created their first piece of apparel. Tracksuits have come in and out of fashion over several decades. The period that featured tracksuits as sportswear that was acceptable to wear outside of the gym was the 1960s and 1970s. Tracksuits first became popular around 1975, made out of cotton, polyester, terry cloth, or a mix. In the late 1970s velour became popular, so much so that it became the most used form of fabric on a tracksuit. The trend of wearing athletic clothing continued into the early 1980s. Tracksuits were eventually replaced by shellsuits, which were made out of nylon, in the late 1980s. This trend was short-lived, lasting only a few years.

In the late 1990s, tracksuits made a comeback in mainstream fashion for both men and women. They returned to the fabrics of the 1970s, most notably polyester. The trend continued into the 2000s, where velour made a comeback, by the likes of Juicy Couture and other brands. This continued for most of the decade. Tracksuits briefly went out of fashion in the late 2000s, resurfacing in the 2010s with "athleisure" trends.

Beginning in the early-2000s, tracksuits have been associated with grime music in the UK and its related culture. This has led to the style of clothing being associated in the mainstream media with the country's gang culture, however grime musicians such as Stormzy have openly disassociated from them.

Since 2006, prominent fashion designers have been asked to design tracksuits for the athletes of various Olympic teams, usually all the athletes representing one country. For example, designer Ralph Lauren created the USA uniforms for the 2010 Winter Olympic Games opening ceremony.  The sportswear company Adidas hired Stella McCartney to be the Creative Director for the 2012 GB Olympic Games (by Adidas)—the first time in the history of the games that a leading fashion designer has designed the apparel for a particular country’s team across all competitions for both the Olympic and the Paralympic Games.

Gallery

See also
Athleisure

References

Sportswear
History of fashion
Suits (clothing)
1970s fashion
1980s fashion
1990s fashion
2000s fashion
2010s fashion